Mystery Ranch is a 1932 American pre-Code Western film directed by David Howard and written by Alfred A. Cohn. The film stars George O'Brien, Cecilia Parker, Charles Middleton, Charles Stevens, Forrester Harvey and Noble Johnson. The film was released on July 1, 1932, by Fox Film Corporation.

Cast        
 George O'Brien as Bob Sanborn
 Cecilia Parker as Jane Emory
 Charles Middleton as Henry Steele
 Charles Stevens as Henchman Tonto
 Forrester Harvey as Artie Brower
 Noble Johnson as Henchman Mudo
 Roy Stewart as Buck Johnson
 Betty Francisco as Appetite Mae
 Russ Powell as Sheriff Bill Burnham

References

External links 
 

1932 films
1932 Western (genre) films
American Western (genre) films
American black-and-white films
Films directed by David Howard
Fox Film films
1930s English-language films
1930s American films